Robert Clay may refer to:

 Bob Clay (born 1946), British former Labour MP
 Robert E. Clay (1875–1961), African-American educator